Rudolf Reicke (5 February 1825, in Memel, East Prussia — 16 October 1905, in Königsberg, Germany) was a German historian and scholar of Kant.

From 1847 to 1852 he studied at the University of Königsberg, where his influences included Karl Rosenkranz and Friedrich Wilhelm Schubert. From 1858 he was associated with the university library and was named head librarian in 1894. In 1864, he founded the Altpreußischen Monatschrift, a journal for "Kantiana".

Literary works 
 Kantiana : Beiträge zu Immanuel Kants Leben und Schriften, 1860 – Kantiana: Contributions to Immanuel Kant's life and writings.
 Lose blätter aus Kants nachlass (3 volumes 1889–98) – Papers from Kant's Nachlass.

References

1825 births
1905 deaths
19th-century German historians
German librarians
German male non-fiction writers
People from Klaipėda
People from East Prussia
University of Königsberg alumni
Academic staff of the University of Königsberg